Henry Harrison "Hy" Myers (April 27, 1889 – May 1, 1965) was a professional baseball player.  He was an outfielder over all or part of 14 seasons (1909–1925) with the Brooklyn Superbas/Robins, St. Louis Cardinals, and Cincinnati Reds.

In 1919 he led the National League in RBIs (73), triples (14), slugging (.436) and total bases (223). He appeared in 154 games the next year for the pennant-winning Robins, again leading the league in triples (22). He participated in the 1916 and 1920 World Series for Brooklyn, losing both times and hitting only .208 (10-48).

In a 14-year career, Myers was a .281 hitter (1380-4910) with 32 home runs, 555 runs, 179 doubles, 100 triples and 559 RBI in 1,310 games played. As a member of the Dodgers he had four 5-hit games.

He was born in 1889 in East Liverpool, Ohio, and died on May 1, 1965, in Minerva, Ohio, at the age of 76.  He was buried in Grove Hill Cemetery in Hanoverton, Ohio.

See also
 List of Major League Baseball career triples leaders
 List of Major League Baseball annual runs batted in leaders
 List of Major League Baseball annual triples leaders

References

External links

1889 births
1965 deaths
Major League Baseball outfielders
Baseball players from Ohio
Brooklyn Robins players
Brooklyn Dodgers players
Brooklyn Superbas players
Cincinnati Reds players
St. Louis Cardinals players
National League RBI champions
People from East Liverpool, Ohio
Major League Baseball center fielders
Connellsville Cokers players
Sioux City Packers players
Mobile Sea Gulls players
Toronto Maple Leafs (International League) players
Newark Indians players
Burials in Ohio